Spring Valley is a valley in Polk County, Oregon, United States, situated north and east of the Eola Hills and west of the Willamette River. It corresponds roughly to the drainage of Spring Valley Creek. Populated places in Spring Valley include Zena and Lincoln. Oregon Route 221 passes along the east side of the valley, next to the Willamette River.

The area is in the Eola-Amity Hills AVA wine region and is home to several notable vineyards, including Cristom.

See also
John Phillips House
Spring Valley Presbyterian Church

References

External links
Coordinates
 Southern end of Spring Valley
 Northern end of Spring Valley

Valleys of Oregon
Landforms of Polk County, Oregon